Stephen O'Flaherty (born April 4, 1970) is an Irish slalom canoer who competed in the early to mid-1990s. He finished 25th in the C-1 event at the 1996 Summer Olympics in Atlanta.

References
Sports-Reference.com profile

1970 births
Canoeists at the 1996 Summer Olympics
Irish male canoeists
Living people
Olympic canoeists of Ireland
Place of birth missing (living people)